Viscount Alexander may refer to:

 Viscount Alexander of Tunis, subsidiary title of the Earl Alexander of Tunis
 Harold Alexander, 1st Earl Alexander of Tunis, Governor General of Canada 1946–52
 École Viscount Alexander, his namesake middle school in Winnipeg
 Viscount Alexander Park, his namesake neighbourhood in East Ottawa
 Viscount Alexander, courtesy title of the heir apparent to the Earl of Caledon
 Viscount Alexander of Hillsborough, subsidiary title of A. V. Alexander, 1st Earl Alexander of Hillsborough

Alexander